Martti "Masa" Elis Niemi (20 July 1914 – 3 May 1960) was a Finnish actor.

Career 
Niemi started his career as a drummer, but became popular as a comedian. He is most famous for his role as "Pätkä" (in English: Stub) in all thirteen original Pekka and Pätkä movies, with Esa Pakarinen as Pekka Puupää, Pätkä's best friend.

Personal life 
Masa Niemi was only 154 cm tall (about 5 feet ½ inch), but he is said to have drunk at least a bottle and a half of Koskenkorva hard liquor every day. In addition to alcoholism, he also suffered from severe stage fright and disturbance of mental health. His alcoholism increased over time, and he eventually had to undergo rehabilitation. In 1960, he committed suicide in Tampere from an overdose of sleeping pills.

Filmography 

 Suviyön salaisuus (1945)
 Kipparikvartetti (1952)
 Lentävä kalakukko (1953)
 Pekka Puupää (1953)
 We're Coming Back (1953)
 Pekka Puupää kesälaitumilla (1953)
 Hei rillumarei! (1954)
 Pekka ja Pätkä lumimiehen jäljillä (1954)
 Taikayö (1954)
 Majuri maantieltä (1954)
 Pekka ja Pätkä puistotäteinä (1955)
 Kiinni on ja pysyy eli Pekan ja Pätkän uudet seikkailut (1955)
 Pekka ja Pätkä pahassa pulassa (1955)
 Pekka ja Pätkä ketjukolarissa (1957)
 Pekka ja Pätkä salapoliiseina (1957)
 Pekka ja Pätkä sammakkomiehinä (1957)
 Pekka ja Pätkä Suezilla (1958)
 Pekka ja Pätkä miljonääreinä (1958)
 Ei ruumiita makuuhuoneeseen (1959)
 Yks' tavallinen Virtanen (1959)
 Pekka ja Pätkä mestarimaalareina (1959)
 Isaskar Keturin ihmeelliset seikkailut (1960)
 Pekka ja Pätkä neekereinä (1960)
 Kaks' tavallista Lahtista (1960)

References

External links 
 
 

1914 births
1960 suicides
Actors from Vyborg
People from Viipuri Province (Grand Duchy of Finland)
Drug-related suicides in Finland
20th-century Finnish male actors